Through Solace is a Welsh Christian hardcore and Christian metal band, and they primarily play hardcore punk, metalcore, post-hardcore, and post-metal. They come from Wales, United Kingdom. The band started making music in 2005, while they disbanded in 2010, and their members were Rohan Bishop, Robert Milligan, Luke Nicholas, Kevin Williams, Kingsley Davis, and Sean Fletcher. Their first two releases, extended plays, Through Solace in 2006, and, The Stand in 2008, were independently released by the band. The band released, a studio album, The World on Standby, in 2009 with Strike First Records.

Background
Through Solace was a Christian hardcore and Christian metal band from Wales, United Kingdom. Their members were Rohan Bishop, Robert Milligan, Luke Nicholas, Kevin Williams, Kingsley Davis, and Sean Fletcher.

Music history
The band commenced as a musical entity in 2005, with their first two releases, being independently released extended plays, Through Solace, in 2006, and, The Stand, in 2008. Their first studio album, The World on Standby, was released by Strike First Records, on 28 April 2008.

Members
Last known line-up
 Luke Nicholas - lead vocals
 Rob Milligan - guitar, background vocals
 Kevin Williams - guitar
 Rohan Bishop - bass
 Sean Fletcher - drums
 Kingsley Davies – ?

Discography
Studio albums
 The World on Standby (April 28, 2009, Strike First)

References

External links
Official website

Welsh metalcore musical groups
British Christian rock groups
Musical groups established in 2005
Musical groups disestablished in 2010
Facedown Records artists
Strike First Records artists